Ali Sofuoğlu (born June 3, 1995) is a Turkish karateka competing in the kata. He is a member of Kağıthane Belediyesi S.K.

In 2021, he won one of the bronze medals in the men's kata event at the 2020 Summer Olympics in Tokyo, Japan.

Career
Ali Sofuoğlu was already European champion at the cadet level in 2010 and 2011. In the juniors he was runner-up three times in a row from 2011 to 2013. At the U21 level, he finally managed to win the World Championship in 2015 and also became European champion two more times in 2014 and 2016. In the adult field, he was already part of the Turkish team that won the bronze medal at the European Championships in Adeje in 2012. His next podium finish came at the 2017 European Championships in İzmit when he finished second in the singles behind Damián Quintero. He repeated this success both in 2018 in Novi Sad and in 2019 in Guadalajara, both times again behind Damián Quintero. In addition, he finished second with the team in 2018 and third in 2019. In 2018, Sofuoğlu also finished third at the World Championships in Madrid. A year later, he once again finished second behind Damián Quintero at the European Games in Minsk.

At the 2020 World Championships held in Dubai in 2021, Sofuoğlu secured third place in the individual and team events, while in Poreč he became European champion in these two disciplines. In 2022, he successfully defended his title in the individual and team events in Gaziantep. Sofuoğlu qualified for the 2020 Tokyo Olympics, also held in 2021, through the Olympic Rankings. He finished the group stage in second place behind Ryō Kiyuna with 27.32 points, advancing to the bronze medal duel against Park Hee-jun. With 27.26 points, he surpassed Park's score of 26.14 points and secured the medal. Behind Olympic champion Ryō Kiyuna and second-place finisher Damián Quintero, Ariel Torres also won a bronze medal alongside Sofuoğlu.

Achievements
2017
  European Championships – 6 May, İzmit, TUR – kata,
2021
  2020 Summer Olympic Games - 6 August, Tokyo, JPN - Kata,

References

External links 
 

1995 births
Living people
Turkish male karateka
European Games medalists in karate
Istanbul Büyükşehir Belediyespor athletes
Karateka at the 2019 European Games
European Games silver medalists for Turkey
Karateka at the 2020 Summer Olympics
Olympic karateka of Turkey
Olympic medalists in karate
Olympic bronze medalists for Turkey
Medalists at the 2020 Summer Olympics
Islamic Solidarity Games medalists in karate
Islamic Solidarity Games competitors for Turkey
21st-century Turkish people